Liolaemus cyanogaster (cyan tree iguana ) is a species of lizard in the family Liolaemidae. It is endemic to Chile, being abundant between Concepción and Puerto Montt.

References

Reptiles de Chile, Roberto Donoso-Barros. Ediciones Universidad de Chile., 1966

cyanogaster
Lizards of South America
Endemic fauna of Chile
Reptiles of Chile
Reptiles described in 1837
Taxa named by André Marie Constant Duméril
Taxa named by Gabriel Bibron